Athena Lee Yen or Cloud Yin (born 20 November 1981) is a Taiwanese actress who graduated from the New Taipei Municipal Jui-Fang Industrial High School.

Private life
She married  who was chairperson of Changhua County and the chairperson of the Republic of China Basketball Association.

Filmography
2001
 Key Children
 According To The First Mountain Day
2002
 Do Not Go To Work Today
 The First Theater - Acacia Dream
2003
 The First Theater - Trinidad Love
 A Good Man Goes
 Home
 Taiwan Tornado
 Sentient World
2004
Taiwan Tornado
2005
 Golden Ferris Wheel (）
2006
 Life Abroad (）
 Burning Paradise (）
2007
 Unique Flavor (）
 Liu Bo Wen, The Legendary Liu Bo Wen
2008
Love Above All／Pay It Forward
2009
Parents
2011
 Family Harmony 
 Hand
2013
 Backlight Love
 Ordinary Love
2015
 Taste of Life
2017
 In The Family
2018
The Sound of Happiness (

References

External links
Athena Lee Yen

1981 births
Actresses from New Taipei
Living people
Taiwanese television actresses
21st-century Taiwanese actresses